This is a list of tennis players who have represented the Brazil Davis Cup team in an official Davis Cup match. Brazil have taken part in the competition since 1932.

Players

References

Lists of Davis Cup tennis players
 Davis Cup
Davis